Qıvraq (also, Givrakh, Kivrag, Kivrakh, Kyvrak, and Kyvrakh) is a village and municipality in, and is the administrative center of, the Kangarli District of Nakhchivan, Azerbaijan.  It has a population of 4,444.

References 

Populated places in Kangarli District